Dörtyol is a village in the Karlıova District, Bingöl Province, Turkey. The village had a population of 318 in 2021.

References 

Villages in Karlıova District
Kurdish settlements in Bingöl Province